The Heart of the City Tour was a co-headlining concert tour by American recording artists Mary J. Blige and Jay-Z. The North America tour supports Blige's eighth studio album, Growing Pains (2007) and Jay-Z's tenth studio album American Gangster (2007). According to Pollstar.com the Heart of the City Tour grossed over $34.2 million, making it the most successful male-female hip-hop/R&B tour in history. The-Dream was the opening act for the tour, supporting his 2007 debut album Love/Hate.

Opening act
 The-Dream

Set list

Tour dates

References

2008 concert tours
Co-headlining concert tours
Jay-Z concert tours
Mary J. Blige concert tours